The Epiphany Chapel and Church House is a historic church at Odenton, Anne Arundel County, Maryland, United States. It is a two-story gable-roofed frame building constructed in 1918 and laid out in cruciform plan in the Arts and Crafts style. It is significant for its association with the mobilization of the United States military for World War I, since it was constructed adjacent to Camp Meade (now known as Fort George G. Meade), a major training camp for troops bound for the Western Front in Europe. Its design was an early work of the prominent Baltimore architect Riggin T. Buckler (1882-1955) of the partnership/firm of Sill, Buckler & Fenhagen.

The Epiphany Chapel and Church House was listed on the National Register of Historic Places in 2001.

Gallery

References

External links
, including photo from 2001, at Maryland Historical Trust
Epiphany Episcopal Church website

Churches on the National Register of Historic Places in Maryland
Episcopal church buildings in Maryland
Churches in Anne Arundel County, Maryland
Churches completed in 1918
20th-century Episcopal church buildings
National Register of Historic Places in Anne Arundel County, Maryland
Odenton, Maryland